Beopjeong (5 November 1932 - 11 March 2010), born Pak Jaecheol, was a Buddhist monk and writer from South Korea.

Biography
Born in 1932 in Haenam County, South Jeolla Province, Beopjeong graduated from Mokpo Commercial High School and entered Chonnam National University. In 1954, his junior year, he left school and decided to become a Buddhist monk as a follower of Hyobong Hangnul, a Jogye Seon master.

Beopjeong was widely known for his musoyu spirit, literally meaning "nonpossession" or "lack of possession," which he propagated through many of his publications, which have been loved by many Koreans. The following is a representative example of his direct, poignant style:

On December 14 1997, Cardinal Stephen Kim Sou-hwan of the Korean Catholic Church attended and offered congratulations on the opening of Gilsangsa Temple, located in Seongbuk District, Seoul. In return, Beopjeong visited Myeongdong Cathedral on February 24, 1998, and delivered a special speech showing the harmony between religions.

On March 11 2010, at the age of 77, in the 55th year of his monkhood, Beopjeong died in Gilsangsa, as a result of chronic lung cancer.

He said in his will: "Don't hold a funeral for me. Don't make a coffin. Dress me in cotton, which I used to wear. Scatter my ashes on the flower garden of the hut where I used to live." In accordance with his will, a simple cremation rite was held at Songgwangsa in Suncheon on March 13, 2010. There was no decorated bier or elegies, and thousands of people from all over the country attended.

Bibliography

In Korean
 Non-Possession (무소유, 無所有) 
 The Sound of the Soul 
 Words and Silence 
 The Sound of Water, the Sound of Wind 
 Quiet Talks in the Mountains 
 Throwing It Away, Leaving It All Behind 
 India Travel Journal 
 Desolate Forests, As Birds Have Gone 
 Flower Blossoms in the Mountains 
 The Beautiful Finish 
 The Joy of Living Alone 
 One Life, One Meeting 
 One for All, All for One 
 May All Beings Be Happy 
 The Books I Have Loved

In translation
May All Beings Be Happy (2006) - edited by Ryu Shiva, translated by Matty Wegehaupt
The Sound of Water, the Sound of Wind (2010) - edited and translated by Brian Barry
Meditations of a Zen Master (2012) - edited and translated by David Bannon
Meditations of a Korean Monk (2012) - edited and translated by David Bannon

See also
Buddhism in Korea

References

External links
 Documentary: Beopjeong's Chair (2011),, narrated by Choi Bool-am

Chogye Buddhists
Seon Buddhist monks
South Korean Buddhist monks
1932 births
2010 deaths
People from South Jeolla Province